"Give Me a Sign", or as listed on charts and the single "Give Me a Sign (Forever and Ever)", is a song by American rock band Breaking Benjamin. It was released in January 2010 as the second single from their fourth album Dear Agony.

Release
The song was released as a radio single on January 5, 2010. Upon its release as a single, the song has adopted the extended title, "Give Me a Sign (Forever and Ever)". The song reached number 97 on the Billboard Hot 100. It was far more successful on the Billboard rock charts, reaching number six on the Hot Mainstream Rock Tracks chart, number nine on the Hot Rock Songs chart, and number 10 on the Alternative Songs chart.

An acoustic version was released by the band on January 13, 2010. The acoustic version was placed on the Japanese import release of Dear Agony.

Along with the singles "Sooner or Later" and "Until the End", "Give Me a Sign" has been released as a downloadable song on Guitar Hero 5 and Band Hero through the Breaking Benjamin Track Pack DLC.

Track listing

Music video
On February 17, a music video was put into the planning process. The band shot the video for "Give Me a Sign" with acclaimed director Nigel Dick. While singer Benjamin Burnley said he had not completely divulged the concept, he added an element of suspense by stating that he hoped fans of the band would "recognize and be excited by the inclusion of certain key characters from the band's past". The video premiered on their Myspace page on March 10, which happened to be Benjamin Burnley's 32nd birthday. It is the last Breaking Benjamin video to feature Aaron Fink, Mark Klepaski, and Chad Szeliga.

The music video shows a young woman rushed into a hospital, her fiancé, an old man, and a young child. A man whose face can't be seen comes into their rooms and takes their hands. Each room features artwork from Breaking Benjamin's albums. The young boy's room has a picture of the cover art from Saturate. The old man with the Breaking Benjamin tattoo on his finger is from the cover of We Are Not Alone. The faceless man is the "Evil Angel" from the cover of Phobia, and the song of the same name; and the woman in the hospital bed resembles Jane from "The Diary of Jane" music video. Her room features the MRI scan of Ben's head from the cover of Dear Agony.

Charts

Weekly charts

Year-end charts

Certifications

References

Breaking Benjamin songs
2009 songs
2010 singles
Rock ballads
Hollywood Records singles
Songs written by Benjamin Burnley
Music videos directed by Nigel Dick
American alternative rock songs